David Justin Taylor (born August 26, 1997) is an American professional soccer player who plays as a full-back for Major League Soccer club Minnesota United.

Club career
Born in Raleigh, North Carolina, Taylor spent four years with CASL Chelsea before joining the academy system at North Carolina FC, then named Carolina RailHawks. He signed an amateur contract with the RailHawks first-team in May 2015 but did not make an appearance before moving abroad.

Later that year, Taylor signed with Spanish  Torre Levante and joined their youth side. He then joined Buñol in 2017.

North Carolina FC
On July 27, 2017, Taylor returned to the United States and signed a professional contract with North Carolina FC in the North American Soccer League. A few days prior to signing, Taylor had appeared for North Carolina FC in a friendly against Swansea City as a guest player. He made his debut for the club on August 13 against the Jacksonville Armada. He started and played 65 minutes as North Carolina FC drew the match 2–2.

After appearing in just two matches for the side in 2017, Taylor established himself as the starting right-back for the club's debut season in the USL Championship, playing 32 matches. He started 33 matches the following season. On January 6, 2020, Taylor signed a contract extension with the club, keeping him with North Carolina FC for a fourth season.

Minnesota United
On February 16, 2021, Taylor joined Major League Soccer (MLS) club Minnesota United. He made his debut for the club on July 3, 2021, coming on as a substitute in a 2–2 home draw against the San Jose Earthquakes. He scored his first MLS goal against FC Dallas on May 22, 2022.

International
In 2015, Taylor made two appearances for the United States under-18 side in the Copa Chivas Tournament, scoring one goal.

Career statistics

Club

References

1997 births
Living people
People from Raleigh, North Carolina
American soccer players
Association football defenders
North Carolina FC players
CF Torre Levante players
Minnesota United FC players
North American Soccer League players
USL Championship players
Major League Soccer players
Soccer players from North Carolina
American expatriate soccer players
Expatriate footballers in Spain